Martin Carthy MBE (born 21 May 1941) is an English folk singer and guitarist who has remained one of the most influential figures in British traditional music, inspiring contemporaries such as Bob Dylan and Paul Simon, and later artists such as Richard Thompson, since he emerged as a young musician in the early days of the folk revival in the UK during the 1960s and 1970s.

Early life
He was born in Hatfield, Hertfordshire, England, and grew up in Hampstead, North West London. His mother was an active socialist and his father, from a family of Thames lightermen, went to grammar school and became a trade unionist and a councillor for Stepney at the age of 21. Martin's father had played fiddle and guitar as a young man but Martin was unaware of this connection to his folk music heritage until much later in life. His vocal and musical training began when he became a chorister at the Queen's Chapel of The Savoy. He picked up his father's old guitar for the first time after hearing "Rock Island Line" by Lonnie Donegan. He has cited his first major folk music influences as Big Bill Broonzy and the syncopated guitar style of Elizabeth Cotten. Carthy performed his first professional engagement at the age of 16 at The Loft, a coffee bar in Primrose Gardens. Although his father wanted him to go to university to study classics, Carthy left school at 17 and worked behind the scenes as a prompter at the open-air theatre in Regent's Park, then as an assistant stage manager (ASM) on a tour of The Merry Widow, and then at Theatre in the Round in Scarborough. He became a resident at The Troubadour folk club in Earls Court in the early 1960s after his friend Robin Hall persuaded him to visit and listen to the piper Seamus Ennis. He joined Redd Sullivan's Thameside Four in 1961 as a skiffle guitarist and singer.

In the early 1960s, Carthy visited Ewan MacColl's Ballads & Blues club to watch a friend, the singer Roy Guest. The main performer that night was Sam Larner. Carthy has since described how Larner's performance of "Lofty Tall Ship" altered his perception of how a traditional folk song could be sung, and how it was a key moment in his own development as an artist.

When American singer Bob Dylan arrived in London for the first time in 1962 to perform in Madhouse on Castle Street, he visited Martin Carthy at The Troubadour, The King & Queen, and The Singers Club. He learned the traditional song "Scarborough Fair" from Carthy, which he later developed into his own song "Girl from the North Country".

Musical career
Carthy is a mostly solo performer of traditional songs in a very distinctive style, accompanying himself on his Martin 000-18 acoustic guitar; his style is marked by the use of alternative tunings (notably CGCDGA), and a strongly percussive picking style that emphasises the melody.

In 1964, Carthy joined Marian Mackenzie, Ralph Trainer and Leon Rosselson in the group The Three City Four. The group concentrated on contemporary songs, including some of Rosselson's own, and made two albums – the first for Decca and a second, Smoke and Dust (Where the Heart Should Have Been), for CBS. The 1965 eponymous debut The Three City Four featured Carthy singing lead vocals on two tracks – Sydney Carter's "Telephone Song" and Rosselson's own "History Lesson". Roy Bailey would replace Carthy when he later left the group.

Carthy's debut solo album, Martin Carthy, was released in 1965, and also featured Dave Swarbrick playing fiddle on some tracks, although he was not mentioned in the album's sleeve notes. Carthy's arrangement of the traditional ballad "Scarborough Fair" was adapted, without acknowledgement, by Paul Simon on the Simon and Garfunkel album recording Parsley, Sage, Rosemary and Thyme in 1966. This caused a rift between the pair which was not resolved until Simon invited Carthy to sing the song with him on-stage at the Hammersmith Apollo in 2000.

Musical collaborations
He has also been involved with many musical collaborations.  He has sung with The Watersons since 1972; was twice a member of British folk rock group Steeleye Span; was a member of the Albion Country Band 1973 line-up, with members from the Fairport Convention family and John Kirkpatrick, that recorded the Battle of the Field album; and was part of the innovative Brass Monkey ensemble, which mixed a range of brass instruments with Carthy's guitar and mandolin and John Kirkpatrick's accordion, melodeon and concertina. Carthy was also a member of The Imagined Village for all three of their albums (2007–2012).

For many years Carthy enjoyed a creative partnership with fiddle player Dave Swarbrick; more recently, Waterson:Carthy has provided the forum for his successful musical partnership with wife Norma Waterson and their daughter Eliza Carthy.

Awards and honours
In June 1998 he was appointed an MBE in the Queen's Birthday Honours. He was named Folk Singer of the Year at the BBC Radio 2 Folk Awards in 2002, and again in 2005 when he also won the award for Best Traditional Track for "The Famous Flower of Serving-Men". In the 2007 Folk Awards Martin Carthy and Dave Swarbrick won Best Duo. In 2008 he was made an Honorary Fellow of the University of Central Lancashire. In 2014 he was awarded the Lifetime Achievement Award at the BBC Radio 2 Folk Awards.

Discography

Original/studio albums (solo or with Dave Swarbrick)

 Martin Carthy (1965) with Dave Swarbrick
 Second Album (1966) with Dave Swarbrick
 Byker Hill (1967) with Dave Swarbrick
 But Two Came By (1968) with Dave Swarbrick
 Prince Heathen (1969) with Dave Swarbrick
 Landfall (1971)
 Shearwater (1972, reissued in 2005 with three extra tracks)
 Sweet Wivelsfield (1974)
 Crown of Horn  (1976)
 Because It's There (1979)
 Out of the Cut (1982)
 Right of Passage (1988)
 Life and Limb (1990) with Dave Swarbrick
 Skin and Bone (1992) with Dave Swarbrick
 Signs of Life (1998)
 Waiting for Angels (2004)
 Straws in the Wind (2006) with Dave Swarbrick

Compilations and live albums
 This Is... Martin Carthy: The Bonny Black Hare and other songs (1971) with Dave Swarbrick [six tracks from Byker Hill and six tracks from But Two Came By]
 Selections (1971) with Dave Swarbrick [six tracks from Byker Hill; three tracks from No Songs EP, 1967; three tracks from But Two Came By]
 Selections (1972), New Zealand and Australia only
 Round Up (circa early 1970s) with Dave Swarbrick [second side of Martin Carthy and first side of Second Album]
 Brigg Fair (circa early 1970s) with Dave Swarbrick [reissue of Byker Hill]
 Tales of Long Ago (circa early 1970s) with Dave Swarbrick [reissue of But Two Came By]
 The Collection (1993)
 Rigs of the Time: The Best Of Martin Carthy (1993)
 The Kershaw Sessions (1994) [recorded for BBC Radio, 1987 and 1988]
 A Collection (1999)
 Both Ears and the Tail (2000, live recording from 1966) with Dave Swarbrick
 The Carthy Chronicles (2001), 4-CD 83-track box set
 The Definitive Collection (2003)
 Martin Carthy at Ruskin Mill (2005) [very limited release – only 200 copies]
 The January Man: Live In Belfast 1978 (2011)
 Walnut Creek: Live Recordings, 1989–1996 (2011)
 Essential Martin Carthy (2011)

Releases on other formats
 No Songs (7-inch vinyl EP 1967) with Dave Swarbrick
 "The Bonny Lass of Anglesey" b/w "Palaces of Gold" (7-inch vinyl single 1976)
 100 Not Out (1992), longform video with Dave Swarbrick
 British Fingerstyle Guitar (instructional VHS video released 1993, reissued on DVD 2006)
 Guitar Maestros (DVD 2006)

As a member of Steeleye Span
 Please to See the King (1971)
 Ten Man Mop, or Mr. Reservoir Butler Rides Again (1971)
 Storm Force Ten (1977)
 Live at Last (1978)
 The Journey (Live at The Forum, London, 1995) (1999)

With Ashley Hutchings, the Albion Country Band and the Albion Band
 Battle of the Field (1976, recorded 1973)
 Son of Morris On (1976)
 Rise Up Like the Sun (1978), as guest
 Lark Rise To Candleford (1980)
 The BBC Sessions (1998) (tracks 1–4 recorded 1973)

As a member of The Watersons and Waterson:Carthy and with Eliza Carthy

 Lal & Mike Waterson: Bright Phoebus (1972)
 The Watersons: For Pence and Spicy Ale (1975)
 The Watersons: Sound, Sound Your Instruments of Joy (1977)
 The Watersons: Green Fields (1981)
 Waterson:Carthy: Waterson:Carthy (1994)
 Waterson:Carthy: Common Tongue (1996)
 Waterson:Carthy: Broken Ground (1999)
 Waterson:Carthy: A Dark Light (2002)
 The Watersons: The Definitive Collection (2003)
 Waterson:Carthy: Fishes & Fine Yellow Sand (2004)
 The Watersons: Mighty River of Song (2004) 4-CD & DVD box set of Watersons and related recordings
 The Watersons: A Yorkshire Christmas (2005)
 Waterson:Carthy: The Definitive Collection (2005)
 Waterson:Carthy: Holy Heathens and the Old Green Man (2006)
 Martin & Eliza Carthy: The Moral of the Elephant (2014)
 Norma Waterson & Eliza Carthy with the Gift Band: Anchor (2018)

As a member of Brass Monkey
 Brass Monkey (1984)
 See How It Runs (1986)
 The Complete Brass Monkey (1993) compilation of the previous two albums
 Sound and Rumour (1999)
 Going and Staying (2001)
 Flame of Fire (2004)
 The Definitive Collection (2005)
 Head of Steam (2009)

As a member of Blue Murder
 No One Stands Alone (2002)

Other notable releases
 Thamesiders & Davy Graham (1963) 7-inch EP
 Three City Four: Three City Four (1965)
 Dave Swarbrick, Martin Carthy & Diz Disley: Rags, Reels & Airs (1967)
 Hedy West, Serves 'Em Fine (1967) (as accompanist)
 Various Artists: Bright Phoebus: Songs by Lal & Mike Waterson (1972)
 John Kirkpatrick: Plain Capers (1976)
 Yuletracks (1986)
 Band of Hope: Rhythm And Reds (1994)
 Wood, Wilson, Carthy: Wood, Wilson, Carthy (1998)
 Dave Swarbrick: Swarb! (2003) 4-CD box set career retrospective with numerous Carthy tracks
 Martins4: Guitar Nights presents the Four Martins (2003) released on CD and DVD (DVD has additional tracks)
 Various Artists: The Imagined Village (2007)
 The Imagined Village: Empire & Love (2010)
 The Imagined Village: Bending The Dark (2012)
 Three City Four: Smoke & Dust (2010), compilation of tracks from two 1960s albums.

Topic Records 70 year anniversary boxed set Three Score and Ten issued in 2009
Carthy features throughout this boxed set as follows:

As Martin Carthy (solo or with Dave Swarbrick)
"Prince Heathen" from the album of the same name is track twelve of the second CD.
"The Dominion of the Sword" from Rights of Passage is track two on the fifth CD.
"Perfumes of Arabia" from Skin and Bone is track twenty two on the sixth CD.
As Part of the WatersonsFor Pence and Spiced Ale is one of the classic albums 
As Part of Brass Monkey
"The Maid And The Palmer" from Brass Monkey is track eighteen on the second CD.
"George's Son" from See How It Runs is track nine on the fifth CD.
As Part of Waterson:Carthy
Waterson:Carthy is one of the classic albums. 
"We Poor Labouring Men" from Broken Ground'' is track twenty one on the sixth CD.

References

External links

 Mainly Norfolk's unofficial website
 John Crosby's 1993 Martin Carthy biography on Mainly Norfolk
 BBC Folk database
 discography on Slipcue e-zine
 
 

1941 births
English folk guitarists
English male guitarists
English folk singers
Living people
Members of the Order of the British Empire
Fingerstyle guitarists
People from Hampstead
People from Hatfield, Hertfordshire
Steeleye Span members
People from the Borough of Scarborough
British folk rock musicians
Musicians from Hertfordshire
Waterson–Carthy members
The Albion Band members
The Watersons members
Blue Murder (folk group) members
Brass Monkey (band) members
Topic Records artists
Fontana Records artists
Deram Records artists
Philips Records artists